Civil Supplies Department is a department under the state Government of Kerala, India. This is the operational department of the Food and Civil Supplies Department at the Kerala Government Secretariat. 

The Civil Supplies Department discharges the important responsibilities of Public Distribution, enforcement of markets discipline and promotion of consumer awareness and protection of their interest. The Civil Supplies Department is responsible for public distribution, market discipline enforcement, and consumer awareness and protection. It received numerous awards in the 1960s and 1970s for pioneering achievements in the implementation of the Universal Rationing System. The Department of Civil Supplies functions under the  Department of Food, Civil Supplies, and Consumer Affairs of the Government of Kerala. The Commissioner of Civil Supplies is the Department's principal head and Principal Advisor to the Minister in charge of Food and Civil Supplies Department. The administrative head of the Department of Civil Supplies is the Director of Civil Supplies.

See also
 Department of Co-operation, Food and Consumer Protection (Tamil Nadu)

References 

Government departments of Kerala
State civil supplies departments of India